McRobb is a surname. Notable people with the surname include:

Gary McRobb (born 1956), Canadian politician
Will McRobb, American television and film writer